The gens Carpinatia was a Roman family towards the end of the Republic.  It is best known from a single individual, Lucius Carpinatius, one of the publicani in Sicily during the government of Verres, with whom he was very intimate.  Cicero describes him as pro-magister, or deputy manager of the publicani, and calls him a second Timarchides, referring to one of the chief agents of Verres in his robberies and oppressions.

See also
 List of Roman gentes

Footnotes

Roman gentes